John Henry Cantlie (born 7 November 1970) was a British war photographer and correspondent. He was kidnapped in Syria with James Foley in November 2012. He had previously been kidnapped in Syria alongside Dutch photographer Jeroen Oerlemans in July 2012, but was rescued a week later. In July 2017, reports surfaced in Iraqi media claiming Cantlie had been killed in an airstrike sometime during the battle of Mosul. In October 2017, a French ISIS fighter told French magazine Paris Match that he had seen Cantlie "seven or eight months ago" in Raqqa. In January 2019, an official of the Syrian Democratic Forces stated Cantlie may still be alive inside Deir ez-Zor Governorate, Syria.

Cantlie's family held a memorial service for him in 2022.

Family history
John Henry Cantlie is the great grandson of Sir James Cantlie, a doctor who co-founded the Hong Kong College of Medicine for Chinese in 1887 (later the University of Hong Kong). In 1896, he was instrumental in the protection of the Chinese revolutionary Sun Yat-sen who might otherwise have been executed by the Qing dynasty secret service. His grandfather, Colonel Kenneth Cantlie, designed the China Railways KF locomotive, at 260 tons the largest locomotive of post-war China that remained in service until 1972.

Cantlie's father Paul died on 16 October 2014, having released a video pleading for his son's release on his deathbed.

Career
Cantlie started his journalistic career in the early 1990s as a tester for Sega video-games.

First abduction
Cantlie was reportedly kidnapped by fighters while crossing illegally into Syria from Turkey on 19 July 2012, near Bab al-Hawa. Along with Dutch photographer Jeroen Oerlemans, Cantlie was shot whilst trying to escape their captors. In an interview with The Sun newspaper on 26 August 2012, Cantlie said it was "every Englishman's duty to try and escape if captured." In an account in The Sunday Times on 5 August 2012, Cantlie described his experience.

Oerlemans was shot in the left leg and Cantlie in the left arm during their escape attempt, Cantlie suffering ulnar nerve entrapment (loss of feeling and use of the hand) as a result. In an account of the shooting, Cantlie said some of the British Muslims in the group repeatedly shouted, "die, kafir!". Oerlemans then stated that "the British guys were the most vindictive of them all". They were taken back to the camp where a fighter who claimed to be an NHS doctor stabilised them and treated their wounds. The pair were threatened with execution. Oerlemans stated that it was unclear who held them, but the group of militants were of multiple ethnicities.

Rescue 
On 26 July 2012, one week after being kidnapped, they were rescued by four members of the Free Syrian Army. The rebels came into the camp shooting their weapons and held at least one jihad fighter at gunpoint while Cantlie and Oerlemans were helped into a waiting vehicle. Both photographers had to be assisted as their feet had been seriously injured when they tried to escape and neither could walk. They had lost all their camera equipment, passports and clothes in the incident, and were smuggled back across the border at a crossing used primarily by Syrian refugees. Both photographers claimed they were about to be handed over to a jihad unit affiliated with al-Qaeda for ransom when they were rescued. They were initially treated by a medic for The New York Times in Antakya before being debriefed by Turkish and then British intelligence.

On 9 October 2012, an individual suspected of being involved in the kidnap was arrested at Heathrow Airport, after arriving on a flight from Egypt.

This was Cantlie's second visit to Syria. In March 2012, he became the first Western photographer to witness first-hand an incursion by government ground troops into a city when T72 medium tanks rolled into the city of Saraquib in Idlib province and started shelling indiscriminately. In a feature in The Sunday Telegraph published 31 March, Cantlie wrote: "Then the tanks opened fire. Fist-sized pieces of shrapnel sliced through the air, decapitating one rebel immediately. His rifle clattered to the ground as his friends dragged his headless torso from the line of fire." To illustrate what the Syrian rebels were up against, Cantlie took a photograph looking down the barrel of an advancing T-72.

Second abduction
Cantlie had not appeared in western print or on social media since late 2012, and the trial of one of his alleged captors collapsed in 2013, when he could not be summoned as a witness. In September 2014, it was revealed Cantlie had been abducted a second time, along with American journalist James Foley. Their taxi driver and Foley's translator were not taken, however. They had reportedly been working together on a film about Cantlie’s first abduction. Foley was beheaded in August 2014.

ISIL propaganda
After disappearing for almost two years following his second abduction in late 2012, Cantlie resurfaced on 18 September 2014 in a video posted by the Islamic State of Iraq and the Levant in the first episode of a multi-part series entitled Lend Me Your Ears. As of February 2015, ISIL has released a total of six videos in the Lend Me Your Ears series, all of which feature Cantlie speaking while sitting at a wooden table and wearing orange prison garb against a black backdrop. In the videos, Cantlie adopts a critical position toward Western foreign policy, including military actions, political statements, and media coverage. Cantlie is particularly critical of US and British hostage policy, comparing it unfavourably to the policy of other European countries that negotiate and pay for the release of hostages.

ISIL has released three additional videos apart from the Lend Me Your Ears series. These videos are noteworthy for depicting Cantlie as a Western journalist rather than a Western hostage. In all videos, Cantlie attempts to characterise the facts on the ground in Kobani, Mosul and rebel-controlled Aleppo as far more favourable to ISIL than is portrayed in the Western media.

Since he is speaking as an ISIL prisoner, it is unclear whether and to what degree he holds the views he states. His sister, Jessica, has stated that her brother "believes two-thirds" of what he says in the videos.

Lend Me Your Ears series
ISIL released 7 videos (counting the Introduction) in the Lend Me Your Ears series.

"Inside" videos
These include:
"Inside 'Ayn al Arab (Kobani)" (5:37 minutes), published 28 October 2014 (released to YouTube on 3 February 2015). The piece appears to have been filmed during a brief period when Kobani was occupied by ISIS.
"Inside Mosul" (8:15 minutes), published 3 January 2015 (released to YouTube by Italian broadcaster Canal 25).
"Inside Aleppo" (12:00 minutes), published 9 February 2015 (released to YouTube on 17 February 2015). Cantlie states in the video it will be the last film in the "Inside" series.

Other videos
"John Cantlie Talks About the American Airstrikes on Media Kiosks in Mosul City" (3:36 minutes), published 19 March 2016. One year after the last "Inside" video Cantlie appeared in new propaganda footage from inside Mosul. 
"John Cantlie speaking about the US Bombing Mosul University and other popular areas in the City", published 12 July 2016.
"John Cantlie Talks About Bombing the Bridges, Cutting Water and Electricity from Mosul City" (8:56 minutes), published 7 December 2016.
"John Cantlie Talks About Tank Warfare in Mosul in a new video titled (Tank Hunters)" (47:11 minutes), published 13 December 2016.

Publications during imprisonment
Cantlie published articles in the Dabiq, an ISIL online magazine.

Current status
On 28 July 2017, the Iraqi Al-Sura News Agency alleged that Cantlie had been killed, after the Agency conducted interviews with three captured IS militants. In October 2017, a French ISIS fighter told French magazine Paris Match that he had seen Cantlie "seven or eight months ago" in Raqqa. In January 2019, an official of the Syrian Democratic Forces stated Cantlie may still be alive inside Deir ez-Zor Governorate, Syria.

In February 2019, British Security Minister Ben Wallace stated that Cantlie is believed to still be alive. A British Home Office spokesman  said: "We do not discuss individual kidnap cases and speculation is unhelpful." Wallace declined to give details of where British intelligence believes Cantlie is still being held by IS.

However, Cantlie's family believes he was killed and held a funeral for him in 2022.

See also
 American-led intervention in Iraq (2014–present)
 Austin Tice
 'The Beatles' terrorist cell 
 Beheading in Islamism
 Daniel Pearl
 David Cawthorne Haines
 Foreign hostages in Iraq
 ISIL beheading incidents
 Kenneth Bigley
 Nick Berg

References

External links
 
 "Military journalists honour NYT's 'A Year at War', other contest entries", Jim Romenesko, poynter.org, 29 September 2011

1970 births
British people taken hostage
British photojournalists
British propagandists
British war correspondents
Foreign hostages in Iraq
Foreign hostages in Syria
Islamic State of Iraq and the Levant propagandists
Kidnapped British people
Missing people
Missing person cases in Syria
Photographers from Hampshire
War correspondents of the Syrian civil war
War photographers